Nadezhda Smirnova (born 22 February 1996) is a Russian footballer who plays for CSKA Moscow and the Russia national team.

She played for Russia at UEFA Women's Euro 2017.

International goals

References

External links
 

1996 births
Living people
Russian women's footballers
Russia women's international footballers
WFC Rossiyanka players
FC Zorky Krasnogorsk (women) players
Russian Women's Football Championship players
Women's association football midfielders
ZFK CSKA Moscow players
People from Sergiyev Posad
Sportspeople from Moscow Oblast
UEFA Women's Euro 2017 players